"Blue Tip" is a song by the American rock band The Cars from their 2011 album Move Like This. The song was written and sung by Cars lead vocalist and songwriter Ric Ocasek.

Release
The song was originally previewed by the band as a 73-second sample on their Facebook page in October 2010. A full video for the song was released February 17, 2011.

The music video was co-produced by Eron Ocasek, one of Ric's sons.

Reception
Billboard described the song's video as "trippy", and Ocasek as "possess[ing] the same vocal strength and sense of catchiness as he did on Cars hits like 'My Best Friend's Girl'." NPR's Elizabeth Nelson called the song "an incandescent pop gem", praising the song's musical structure and "absolutely relentless sing-along chorus". According to Rolling Stone reviewer Andy Greene, the video's "low-tech production fits well with [the] vintage nature of the song".

Personnel
Ric Ocasek – rhythm guitar, lead vocals
Elliot Easton – lead guitar, background vocals
Greg Hawkes – keyboards, bass, background vocals
David Robinson – drums

References

The Cars songs
Song recordings produced by Jacknife Lee
Songs written by Ric Ocasek
2011 songs